Vittoria Coffee is a brand of coffee products manufactured by Vittoria Food and Beverage of Australia. Founded in Sydney in 1947 by brothers Orazio and Carmelo Cantarella, the business was established as an importer of Continental European foods.

In 1958 the brothers began roasting small amounts of premium Arabica coffee at their food importing premises in the Sydney's suburb of Haymarket, initially supplying Sydney's first ‘Italian cafés’.

Today the company is owned by the Schirato family with CEO Les Schirato AM  joined by his son Rolando Schirato as Managing Director.

Vittoria Coffee began an expansion into the United States market in 2014, headed by Rolando and remains Australia's number one pure coffee brand, served in restaurants and cafés around the world.

As well as producing Nespresso-compatible pods, Vittoria has its own pods and brewing machines under the Espressotoria brand.

See also
 List of restaurant chains in Australia

References

External links 
 

Coffee brands
Food and drink companies established in 1958
Coffee companies of Australia
Australian companies established in 1958
Silverwater, New South Wales